Hamman's sign (rarely, Hammond's sign or Hammond's crunch) is a crunching, rasping sound, synchronous with the heartbeat, heard over the precordium in spontaneous mediastinal emphysema. It is felt to result from the heart beating against air-filled tissues.

It is named after Johns Hopkins clinician Louis Hamman, M.D.

This sound is heard best over the left lateral position.  It has been described as a series of precordial crackles that correlate with the heart beat rather than respiration.

Causes
Hamman's crunch is caused by pneumomediastinum or pneumopericardium, and is associated with tracheobronchial injury due to trauma, medical procedures (e.g., bronchoscopy) or rupture of a proximal pulmonary bleb.  It can be seen with Boerhaave syndrome.

See also
Hamman's syndrome

References

External links
Audio of auscultation of Hamman's Sign

Symptoms and signs: Respiratory system